Dakshinamurthy is an aspect of the Hindu god Shiva as a guru (teacher) of all types of knowledge. This aspect of Shiva, as the original guru, is his personification as the supreme or the ultimate awareness, understanding and knowledge. This form represents Shiva as a teacher of yoga, music and wisdom, and giving exposition on the shastras. He is worshipped as the god of wisdom, complete and rewarding meditation. According to Hindu scriptures, if a person doesn't have a guru, they can consider and worship Dakshinamurthy as their guru. Eventually they will be blessed with a self-realised human guru, if they are worthy.

Meaning

Dakshinamurti literally means 'one who is facing south' in Sanskrit. According to another school of thought 'Dakshinya' means Karuna in Sanskrit or kindness (benevolence). So this manifestation of Shiva is a benevolent teacher who accords wisdom to seekers of salvation.
 In most of the Siva temples, the stone image of Dakshinamurthy is installed, facing south, on the southern circumambulatory path around the sanctum sanctorum. Perhaps, of all Hindu Gods, he is the only one sitting facing south. Ramana Maharshi said in letter 89: 
one meaning of Dakshina is efficient; another meaning is 'in the heart on the right side of the body'; Amurthy  'means Formlessness' .
"Dakshinamurthy Stotra" in Sanskrit, means the "Shapelessness situated on the right side".

Depiction

In his aspect as Jnana Dakshinamurti, Shiva is generally shown with four arms. He is depicted seated under a banyan tree, facing the south. Shiva is seated upon a deer-throne and surrounded by sages who are receiving his instruction. He is shown as seated with his right foot on mythical apasmara (a demon which in Hindu mythology, is the personification of ignorance) and his left foot lies folded on his lap. Sometimes even the wild animals, are depicted to surround Shiva. In his upper arms, he holds a snake or rosary or both in one hand and a flame in the other; while in his lower right hand is shown in vyakhyanamudra, his lower left hand holds a bundle of kusha grass or the scriptures. The index finger of his right hand is bent and touching the tip  of his thumb. The other three fingers are stretched apart. This symbolic hand gesture or mudra is the Gnana Mudra (or Jnana Mudra or Jana Mudra), a symbol of knowledge and wisdom. Sometimes, this hand is in the Abhaya Mudra, a posture of assurance and blessing. In Melakadambur the statue of the Dakshinamurthy appears seated on a bull under a banyan tree with a hole extending from one ear to the other.

Dakshinamurthy is portrayed as a powerful form brimming with ever-flowing bliss and supreme joy while being in the yogic state of abstract meditation. Variations of this iconic representation include Veenadhara Dakshinamurthy (holding a Veena) and Rishabharooda Dakshinamurthy (mounted on a Rishabha - the bull).

Significance

Indian tradition accords a special reverence to the guru or the spiritual teacher. Dakshinamurti is regarded as the ultimate guru, the embodiment of knowledge and the destroyer of ignorance (as represented by the demon being crushed under the feet of the deity). The Jnana Mudra is interpreted in this way:- The thumb denotes the god and the index finger denotes the man. The other three fingers stand for the three congenital impurities of man viz. arrogance, illusion and bad deeds of the past births. When man detaches himself from these impurities, he reaches God. Another interpretation is that the other three fingers denote the three states of life: Jagruti (Fully awake through senses and mind), Swapna (Sleep state - When the mind is awake) and Sushupti (True-self - When the senses and mind go into soul - Atma). The Abhaya Mudra, a gesture with the hand lifted above thigh with palm facing out, fingers pointing, is interpreted as his grace upon his students. The rosary or the snake signifies tantric knowledge. The fire represents illumination, removing the darkness of ignorance.

Temples

Even though the icon of Dakshinamurthy is installed in every Shiva temple, there are only a few temples where Dakshinamurthy is the chief deity. 
 Only one of the twelve Jyotirlingas is Dakshinamurthy, the Mahakaleshwar in Ujjain. Being the only Dakshinmurthy Jyotirlinga, It holds special importance for Shaivites as a site of learning.
 A 112 feet, South-facing Adiyogi Shiva statue (Adiyogi  The Source of Yoga) along with a linga called "Yogeshwar Linga" was consecrated by Sadhguru Jaggi Vasudev, and inaugurated by Indian Prime Minister Narendra Modi on February 24, 2017. It is located at the Isha Yoga Center in Coimbatore, India. The South-facing Adiyogi is seen as a representation of Dakshinamurthy, and is considered the Adi Guru or the first Guru.   
 Sree Dakshinamurthy Temple at Sukapuram, Edapal Taluk in Malappuram District, Kerala. Pratishtha was done by Suka Maharshi. It is estimated to be 1500 years old.
 Sree Medha Dakshinamurthy Temple in gujrathipeta, Srikakulam in Andhra Pradesh.
 The deity at the famous Shiva temple in Vaikom town in Kottayam district of Kerala is worshipped as Dakshinamurthy in the morning, Kirathamurthy in the afternoon and as Umamaheshwara in the evening.
 Ettumanoor Mahadevar Temple in Kerala, where the deity enshrined in the form of a Shivalingam is considered as Dakshinamurthy
 Alangudi, Kumbakonam, Tamil Nadu
 Sree Dakshinamurthy Temple at Pattamangalam village, in Sivagangai District, Tamil Nadu. It is estimated that this temple is nearly 500 years old.
 In the Sivanandeswarar temple in Thirupanthurai, Tanjore, Tamil Nadu, He is depicted in the Ardhanari form.
 In Thirupulivanam, we can find Dakshinamurthy in the form of Ardhanariswara. This temple is on the Uthiramerur-Kanchipuram road, 5 km from Uthiramerur, near Chennai.
 In March 2007, a big temple of Lord Dakshinamurty (the first in Maharashtra) was created in the Shrutisagar Ashram, about 30 km from Pune
 Pragya Dakshinamoorthy at Chibavananda Ashram in Theni, western Tamil Nadu
 In Suchindram Thanumalaya temple (5 km from Nagercoil, Kanyakumari Dist.), contrary to tradition, Dakshinamurthy is worshipped instead of Ganesh/Vinayaka. Ganesha statue comes last in the worship line.
 In Thiruvotriyur, Chennai a dedicated temple to Dhakshinamoorthy exists. It is unique as the Lord faces north and is aptly called VadaGurusthalam (the guru's place of north).
 The oldest Dakshnimurthy temple is situated in Poonthottam village in Thiruvarur, Tamil Nadu. It is estimated that this temple is nearly 1000 years old and the idol of the lord was fixed on the day of mahakumbamela that took place 1000 years ago
Dakshinamurthy temple at Vellave near Taliparambu (Kannur District, Kerala), This is a swayambhoo temple (self evolved) of Dakshinamurthi. This temple is situated 4 km away from the famous Rajarajeshwara Temple, Taliparamba
Panaickal Sree Dakshinamurthy temple at Kadakkarappally, Cherthala Thaluk in Alappuzha District, Kerala
 Since 2002, Mauritius has seen its one and only Lord Dakshinamurthy Temple located on the east coast at Palmar on the Indian Ocean, in the compound of Arsha Vidya Ashram. The deity has occupied a place in the Ashram since 1994 but in 2002, a temple was built according to the rules of shahastra nama to give an altar to the Lord.
 One of the temples in the United States dedicated to Lord Dakshinamurthy is located at Arsha Vidya Gurukulam in Saylorsburg, Pennsylvania.
 Adiyogi  The Abode of Yoga is a 30,000 square foot space located at the Isha Institute of Inner-sciences, Tennessee, USA. It houses a 21 feet statue of Adiyogi Shiva (which is seen as representation of Dakshinamurthy),  along with a Shivalinga consecrated by Sadhguru Jaggi Vasudev in September 2015.
 Gurusthalam at Thiruvallur, Tamil Nad Shree Yoga Gnana Dhakshanamoorthy Peetam

Mantras and hymns
Many mantras are dedicated to Lord Dakshinamurthy. Lord Dakshinamurthy is prayed to for protection and overall wellbeing, and for success in education.

Dakshinamurthy Gayatri Mantra

Om Vrishabha-dhvajaaya Vidmahe
Ghruni-Hasthaaa Dheemahi
Thanno Dakshinamoorthy Prachodayaath

ॐ वृषभध्वजाय विद्महे घृणिहस्ताय धीमहि |
तन्नो दक्षिणामूर्ति प्रचोदयात् ||

DakShinamoorthy Stótram by Adi Shankārachārya is a laudatory hymn for this form of Siva.

ॐ मौनव्याख्या प्रकटितपरब्रह्मतत्वंयुवानं
वर्शिष्ठान्तेवसदृषिगणैरावृतं ब्रह्मनिष्ठैः |
आचार्येन्द्रं करकलित चिन्मुद्रमानन्दमूर्तिं
स्वात्मरामं मुदितवदनं दक्षिणामूर्तिमीडे ‖

oṃ maunavyākhyā prakaṭita parabrahmatatvaṃ yuvānaṃ
varśiṣṭhānte vasad ṛṣigaṇair āvṛtaṃ brahmaniṣṭhaiḥ |
ācāryendraṃ karakalita cinmudram ānandamūrtiṃ
svātmarāmaṃ muditavadanaṃ dakṣiṇāmūrtimīḍe ‖

I salute Śrī Dakṣiṇāmūrti, the Young Guru, who teaches the knowledge of Brahman through silence, who is surrounded by disciples, who are themselves ṛṣis and scholars in the Vedas. (I worship Śrī Dakṣiṇāmūrti), who is the teacher of teachers, whose hand is held in the sign of knowledge (cin-mudrā), whose nature is fullness, who reveals in himself, and who is ever silent.

Yogadakshinamurti 
Yoga Dakshinamurti is an aspect of Shiva as a guru (teacher) of yoga.

Representation

In his aspect as Yoga Dakshinamurti, Shiva is generally represented in any of the two styles described as under: -

He is represented sitting in padmasana posture and engrossed in meditation. He is shown as having four arms. His four arms are depicted in different ways. In the upper right hand he holds his trident (trishula); he carries a bowl of human skull in his upper left hand; the lower right hand is shown in chinmudra; and the lower left hand is raised to his chest.
In another representation, he is shown as sitting under a banyan tree. His one leg rests on the ground, while the other is on his thigh, with the help of a Yogapatta. His four arms are shown in different ways. He carries an akshamala in his upper right hand; the upper left hand is shown as carrying fire; the lower right hand is depicted in dyanamudra; and the lower left hand is shown in abhayamudra. Below his seat, two deer are shown squatting, and a cobra wound around his right arm looks towards him.

References

External links
 Dakshinamurthy Stotram

Forms of Shiva
Knowledge gods